Olivier Fraise (born 14 September 1970) is a French luger. He competed in the men's singles event at the 1992 Winter Olympics.

References

External links
 

1970 births
Living people
French male lugers
Olympic lugers of France
Lugers at the 1992 Winter Olympics
Sportspeople from Épinal